Tornado is a scalable, non-blocking web server and web application framework written in Python. It was developed for use by FriendFeed; the company was acquired by Facebook in 2009 and Tornado was open-sourced soon after.

Performance
Tornado is noted for its high performance. Its design enables handling a large number of concurrent connections (i.e., tries to solve the "C10k problem").

Modules
 An asynchronous MongoDB driver called Motor.
 CouchDB drivers called corduroy and trombi.
 Asynchronous driver for PostgreSQL wrapping psycopg called Momoko

Example 
The following code shows a simple web application that displays "Hello World!" when visited:

import asyncio

import tornado.web

class MainHandler(tornado.web.RequestHandler):
    def get(self):
        self.write("Hello, world")

def make_app():
    return tornado.web.Application([(r"/", MainHandler),])

async def main():
    app = make_app()
    app.listen(8888)
    await asyncio.Event().wait()

if __name__ == "__main__":
    asyncio.run(main())

See also

 Django (web framework)
 FastAPI
 Flask (web framework)
 Pylons project
 Web2py
 Comparison of web server software

References

External links
 

Facebook software
Free software programmed in Python
Free web server software
Python (programming language) web frameworks
Web server software for Linux